The music of Iceland includes vibrant folk and pop traditions, as well as an active classical and contemporary music scene. Well-known artists from Iceland include medieval music group Voces Thules, alternative rock band The Sugarcubes, singers Björk, Hafdís Huld and Emiliana Torrini, post-rock band Sigur Rós, post-metal band Sólstafir, indie folk/indie pop band Of Monsters and Men, blues/rock band Kaleo, metal band Skálmöld and techno-industrial band Hatari. Iceland's traditional music is related to Nordic music forms. Although Iceland has a very small population, it is home to many famous and praised bands and musicians.

Folk music

Icelandic music has a very long tradition, with some songs still sung today dating from 14th century. Folk songs are often about love, sailors, masculinity, hard winters, as well as elves, trolls and other mythological creatures, and tend to be quite secular and often humorous. Bjarni Þorsteinsson collected Icelandic folk music between 1906 and 1909, and many of the songs he encountered were accompanied by traditional instruments like the langspil and fiðla, which are among the few musical instruments traditionally played in Iceland. Chain dances, known as víkivaki, have been performed in Iceland since the 11th century at a variety of occasions, such as in churches and during the Christmas season. An example is "Ólafur Liljurós", an Icelandic víkivaki folk song dating to the 14th century, about a man who, while on his way to meet his mother, is seduced, kissed, and stabbed by an elf woman while riding his horse, then eventually dies.

Iceland's isolation meant that, until the 18th century, foreign influences were almost completely absent, which resulted in the maintenance of a particular rhythm, called hákveða, lost in other Nordic countries and considered one of the main characteristics of Icelandic folk music. Hákveða refers to a special emphasis placed on some of the words of a song, often the last word of each sentence in each verse. In the following example, taken from the song "Ólafur Liljurós", hákveða is shown in italics:

Ólafur reið með björgunum fram, villir Hann, stillir "Hann,
hitti hann fyrir sér álfarann, þar rauði loginn brann,
Blíðan lagði byrinn undan björgunum, blíðan lagði byrinn undan björgunum fram.

Rímur are epic tales sung as alliterative, rhyming ballads, usually a cappella. Rímur can be traced back to the Viking Age Eddic poetry of the skalds and employs complex metaphors and cryptic rhymes and forms. Some of the most famous rímur were written between the 18th and early 20th centuries, by poets like Hannes Bjarnason (1776–1838), Jón Sigurðsson (1853–1922) and Sigurður Breiðfjörð (1798–1846).

In the early 18th century, European dances like polka, waltz, reel and schottische begin to arrive via Denmark. These foreign dances are today known as gömlu dansarnir or literally the "old dances". After their arrival, native dance and song traditions fell into serious decline. For a long time, rímur were officially banned by the church. Paradoxically, many Icelandic priests were keen in making rímur. Rímur remained popular recreation until the early 20th century. In recent years, efforts have been made to revive native Icelandic forms. For example, a modern revitalization of the Rímur tradition began in 1929 with the formation of the organization Iðunn.

Protestantism has also left its mark on the music of Iceland. Hallgrímur Pétursson wrote numerous Protestant hymns in the 17th century. In the 19th century, Magnús Stephensen brought pipe organs to Iceland, soon to be followed by harmonium pumped reed-organs. "Heyr himna smiður" ("Hark, Creator of the Heaven") is probably the oldest psalm which is still sung today; it was composed by Kolbeinn Tumason in 1208.

Popular music 
The music of Iceland includes vibrant folk and pop traditions and is expanding in its variety of sound styles and genres. Well-known artists from Iceland include alternative rock band The Sugarcubes, singers Björk, Hafdís Huld and Emilíana Torrini, and post-rock band Sigur Rós, as well as electronic music groups like GusGus. Iceland's traditional music is related to Nordic music forms.

Icelandic popular music today includes many bands and artists, ranging from indie and pop-rock to electronic music. It is also increasingly becoming recognized for its vibrant and growing metal and hardcore scene.

One widely known Icelandic artist is eclectic singer and composer Björk, who has received 15 Grammy nominations and sold over 15 million albums worldwide, including two platinum albums and one gold album in the United States. Another is the post-rock formation Sigur Rós and its lead singer Jónsi. Widely known outside Iceland, they were immortalized in an episode of The Simpsons and more recently in an episode of Game of Thrones.

Popular artists

Indie and pop-rock
According to the Icelandic label Record Records, the indie pop-folk group Of Monsters and Men is Iceland’s biggest act since Björk and Sigur Rós. Their debut album My Head Is an Animal, as well as their first single “Little Talks”, reached high positions in single and album charts worldwide. In 2013 they won the European Border Breakers Awards. Singer-songwriter Ásgeir Trausti did likewise in 2014, and ever since has been successfully touring Europe and the U.S. with his melodic-folk-pop songs, which he sings both in his native language Icelandic and in English. Female singer-songwriter Emiliana Torrini is an established Icelandic artist. Her song "Jungle Drum", from her 2008 album Me and Armini, is well known abroad and reached number one in the German, Austrian, Belgium and Icelandic single charts. Her latest album Tookah, released in 2013, reached the Top 50 album charts in several countries.

Other artists that are attracting attention outside Iceland include the electro-pop group FM Belfast, indie pop / rock / folk band Kaleo as well as the singers and composers Sóley and Sin Fang, who are both known as founding members of the band Seabear.

Alternative and metal
The alternative and metal scene is vibrant with Icelandic bands playing large festivals in Europe and the United States. The metal-band Sólstafir is widely known outside Iceland. Already back in 1999 they had a contract for their debut album with a German record label. The Viking-Metal Band Skálmöld played two sold out shows with the Iceland Symphony Orchestra in the capital’s concert hall Harpa in December 2013. Agent Fresco combine metal, rock and alternative elements with the unique voice of singer Arnór Dan Arnarson and have also gained international attention. The instrumental post-rock and alternative-rock band For a Minor Reflection is widely known since supported Sigur Rós on tour back in 2009. Their sound is often compared to Explosions in the Sky or the Scottish post-rock band Mogwai. Dead Skeletons are not only known for their unique psychedelic-rock sound but also for their artwork and an art gallery in Reykjavik run by front man and singer Jón Sæmundur Auðarson. 
The Vintage Caravan, founded by two of the members in 2006 when they were only 12 years old, have played festivals in Europe, including the Wacken Open Air and toured with bigger bands like Europe and Opeth.

Iceland also has a thriving extreme metal scene which is gaining recognition abroad. The black metal band Svartidauði are widely considered a central figure in the development of the Icelandic black metal scene. Many of the scene's most significant albums were recorded and produced at Studio Emissary, a recording studio set up by Irish musician Stephen Lockhart, and the cassette label Vánagandr has also had a significant role in the development of the country's black metal scene. In 2016, the music festival Oration MMXVI debuted as Iceland's first black metal festival, and subsequently returned for two final instalments in 2017 and 2018. In 2016, black metal band Misþyrming were selected as one of Roadburn Fesitval's artists in residence.

Electronic music
The techno house group GusGus is one of Iceland’s most successful exports in the field of electronic music. So far they released nine studio albums. The latest Lies Are More Flexible came out in February 2018.

Other artists include DJ duo Gluteus Maximus, Hermigervill, Bloodgroup and Sísý Ey.

The international franchise Sónar held their first festival in Reykjavik in 2013 with a long roster of international and local electronic acts.

Experimental
Ben Frost, born in Melbourne, living in Reykjavik, is bringing together electronic soundscapes with classical elements and noisy tunes. His latest album, Aurora, was released in June 2014.

Classical elements also characterize the symphonic music of Icelandic born composer and singer Ólafur Arnalds. Other widely known experimental bands are Múm and the high school originated Hjaltalín.

The trio Samaris have gained attention, especially in Europe, and have played festivals all over Europe. Their self-released EP, Stofnar falla, received positive reviews and was followed by their self-titled debut album, released in July 2013.

Mengi in Reijkjavik is a centre for avant garde music, experimental music and contemporary music. The organisation organizes performances, exhibitions, conferences and runs a recording studio and a record label.

Classical music

Composition
Classical music came to Iceland comparatively late, with the first Iceland composers working in the western, classical tradition emerging in the late 19th century and the early 20th century. Among them was Sveinbjörn Sveinbjörnsson, who is considered to have been the first Icelandic professional composer. Among his contributions to Icelandic music is the national anthem, Lofsöngur. Belonging to this first generation of Icelandic composers were Sigvaldi Kaldalóns and Sigfús Einarsson, and Emil Thoroddsen, best known for their songs with piano accompaniment. The most significant Icelandic composer in the first half of the 20th century was Jón Leifs.

Today, Iceland has a vibrant classical music scene, with numerous composers of contemporary music achieving international success. These include Haukur Tómasson, Anna Thorvaldsdottir, Daníel Bjarnason, Jóhann Jóhannsson and Hugi Gudmundsson.

Performance
The first proper orchestral concert in Iceland was held in 1921, in conjunction with the royal visit of Christian X of Denmark, the reigning monarch of Iceland. The ensemble created for the occasion was given the name Hljómsveit Reykjavíkur (The Reykjavík Orchestra), and performed sporadically in the years that followed under the direction of Sigfús Einarsson and Páll Ísólfsson. Following the founding of the Icelandic National Broadcasting Service in 1930, and the festivities at the 1000th anniversary of the Alþingi, and through the pioneering work of musicians like Franz Mixa, Victor Urbancic and Róbert A. Ottóson, this ensemble was slowly transformed into the professional symphony orchestra known today as the Iceland Symphony Orchestra. The orchestra resides in Harpa, Reykjavík's largest concert house, and holds weekly concerts in its Eldborg hall.

Additionally, a number of musical ensembles regularly perform in Reykjavík, playing music that ranges from Baroque to contemporary music. These include Reykjavík Chamber Orchestra, CAPUT ensemble and Nordic Affect. Several classic music festivals are held in Reykjavík and all around Iceland annually, including Dark Music Days and Reykjavík Midsummer Music.

Icelandic classical instrumentalists have achieved success internationally. Undoubtedly, the most famous Icelandic citizen within the world of classical music is the Russian pianist Vladimir Ashkenazy, who settled in Iceland with his Icelandic wife Þórunn Jóhannsdóttir in 1968, following their defection from the Soviet Union. He was awarded Icelandic citizenship in 1972. Other notable, Icelandic classical instrumentalists with international careers include Sigurbjörn Bernharðsson, violinist and member of the Pacifica Quartet, Elfa Rún Kristinsdóttir, violinist, Víkingur Ólafsson, pianist, and the cellist Sæunn Thorsteinsdóttir.

List of Icelandic music artists

 Á Móti Sól
 Árstíðir
 Agent Fresco
 AMFJ
 Amiina
 Anna Mjöll
 Apparat Organ Quartet
 Ásgeir Trausti
 Bang Gang
 Björk
 Bony Man
 Botnleðja
 Bubbi Morthens
 Daði Freyr
 Daníel Ágúst
 Dikta
 Eberg
 Emilíana Torrini
 Eurobandið
 For a Minor Reflection
 FM Belfast
 Glowie 
 GusGus
 HAM
 Hafdís Huld
 Hatari
 Hildur Guðnadóttir
 Hilmar Jensson
 Hjálmar
 Hjaltalín
 Jagúar
 Jakobínarína
 Jófríður Ákadóttir
 Jóhann Jóhannsson
 JóiPé 
 Jónsi
 Jónsi & Alex
 Just Another Snake Cult
 Kaleo
 Kiasmos
 Kukl
 Lay Low
 Leaves
 Leoncie
 Low Roar 
 Magni Ásgeirsson (Rock Star Supernova)
 Maus
 Megas
 Mammút
 Mezzoforte
 Mínus
 Moses Hightower
 Mugison
 múm
 Noise
 Of Monsters and Men
 Ólafur Arnalds
 Ólöf Arnalds
 Páll Óskar
 Parachutes
 Pascal Pinon
 Purrkur Pillnikk
 Quarashi
 Ragnheiður Gröndal
 Rökkurró
 Samaris
 Sálin hans Jóns míns
 Sigur Rós
 Sign
 Seabear
 Sin Fang
 Singapore Sling
 Skálmöld
 Sóley
 Sólstafir
 Stafrænn Hákon
 Steed Lord
 Stjórnin
 Svala Björgvinsdóttir 
 Svartidauði
 The Sugarcubes
 Tappi Tíkarrass
 Todmobile
 Trabant
 Valgeir Sigurðsson
 Vök
 Weapons
 Yohanna
 Þeyr

National anthem
The national anthem of Iceland is "Lofsöngur", written by Matthías Jochumsson, with music by Sveinbjörn Sveinbjörnsson. The song, in the form of a hymn, was written in 1874, when Iceland celebrated the one thousandth anniversary of settlement on the island. It was first published under the title "A Hymn in Commemoration of Iceland's Thousand Years".

Music institutions
 Iceland Music aims to aid in exporting Icelandic music abroad. It runs a website and newsletter with information about Icelandic music, with a social media presence where an audience can follow development in Icelandic music. ÚTÓN is the local wing of Iceland Music which educates musicians on matters of music promotion as well as administering funds and general consultation.
 The Music Information Center (MIC) is a national agency for contemporary and older, mostly classical, music. It is also part of the International Music Information center.
 Samtónn is an umbrella organization for Icelandic authors, performers and producers.
 Mengi in Reijkjavik is a centre for avant garde music, experimental music and contemporary music. The organisation organizes performances, exhibitions, conferences and runs a recording studio and a record label.

Festivals
Iceland hosts a variety of music festivals. The biggest festival is Iceland Airwaves with over 9000 guests. It takes place in the central area of Iceland’s capital city Reykjavík for five days at the beginning of November. There is also an up-and-coming festival, Secret Solstice, which was held for the first time in the summer of 2014, June 20–22. The festival took place at the Laugardalur recreational area, also known as Hot Spring Valley, which is located just 15 minutes from downtown Reykjavik. There are also a number of intimate and transformative festivals that happen year-round in the countryside, such as Saga Fest in Selfoss and LungA Art Festival in Seyðisfjörður.

Other festivals are:

 Dark Music Days	
 Sónar Reykjavík	
 Reykjavik Folk Festival	
 Battle of the Bands - Músíktilraunir	
 AK Extreme	
 Tectonics	
 Reykjavík Blues Festival	
 Aldrei fór ég suður 
 Norðanpaunk
 Gardabaer Jazz Festival	
 RAFLOST	
 Reykjavík Arts Festival	
 Reykjavík Music Mess	
 Reykjavík Midsummer Music	
 IS NORD	
 Við Djúpið - Summer Courses and Music Festival		
 JEA Jazz Festival	
 Blue North Music Festival	
 Kirkjubæjarklaustur Chamber Music Festival	
 Skálholt Summer Concerts	
 Folk music festival of Siglufjordur	
 Rauðasandur Festival	
 All Tomorrow's Parties	
 The Blue Church Concert Series	
 Eistnaflug
 Extreme Chill Festival	
 Frum - Contemporary Music Festival	
 LungA	
 Saga Fest	
 Reykjavik Accordion Festival	
 Reykholt Music Festival	
 Bræðslan	
 Síldarævintýrið	
 Innipúkinn	
 Neistaflug	
 Þjóðhátíð í Eyjum	
 The Icelandic Chamber Music Festival	
 Pönk á Patró
 Reykjavík Jazz Festival	
 Gæran	
 Tradition for tomorrow	
 Reykjavik Cultural Festival	
 Melodica Acoustic Festival Reykjavik	
 Night of lights	
 Októberfest á Íslandi	
 Rokkjötnar	
 Sláturtíð

Venues
Concert hall Harpa held its opening concert on May 4, 2011. Bigger concerts are held in sportshalls Laugardalshöll, Egilshöll and Kórinn. Theaters such as Gamla bíó, Bæjarbíó and Iðnó are used for concerts. Austurbær is an old movie theater.

Smaller concerts are held at smaller venues or pubs located mainly around capital area.

Record labels
Some of the labels mostly concentrate on one genre, whilst others are promoting many types of music. 12 Tónar and Smekkleysa run record stores in Reykjavik.

 12 Tónar	
 Bedroom Community	
 Blánótt	
 Ching Ching Bling Bling	
 Dimma
 Dirrindí	
 Geimsteinn	
 Hljóðaklettar	
 Kimi Records	
 Kóp Boys Entertainment (KBE)
 Lady Boy Records	
 Lagaffe Tales	
 Mugiboogie	
 Möller Records	
 Record Records	
 Sena	
 SJS Music	
 Smekkleysa SM/Bad Taste SM	
 Synthadelia	
 Zonet Music

Producers and studios
 Bang Studio	
 Greenhouse Studios	
 Hljodriti (Studio Syrland Hafnarfjordur)	
 Medialux HQ	 
 Orgelsmiðjan	
 Studio Syrland	
 Sundlaugin Studio
 Gryfjan

Notes

References

The Icelandic music scene after the economic collapse 
The Real Icelandic Music Scene -- REDEFINE magazine
</ref>

External links

Icelandiclyrics.com
Iceland Music, the music export office of Iceland which includes a comprehensive database of Icelandic music and musicians (in English)
Kraumur Music Fund, supports Icelandic artists, Björk and Kjartan Sveinsson of Sigur Rós are board members (in English)
Musik.is: The Icelandic Music Page
Music From The Moon A scenic documentary movie about music in Iceland & Greenland
ShopIcelandic Music
Iceland Airwaves